Salvia fragarioides is a perennial plant that is native to Yunnan province in China, growing on rocky riverbanks at  elevation. Inflorescences are 2 to many-flowered widely spaced verticillasters. It is a close ally of Salvia japonica.

Notes

fragarioides
Flora of China